Chloe Benjamin is an American author. She has written two novels: The Immortalists (2018) and The Anatomy of Dreams (2014). The Immortalists was a New York Times bestseller.

Benjamin is from San Francisco, California. She received her undergraduate degree from Vassar College and her Master of Fine Arts from the University of Wisconsin–Madison.

References

External links
 

Writers from San Francisco
Vassar College alumni
University of Wisconsin–Madison alumni
Living people
21st-century American women writers
Year of birth missing (living people)